Calymperes is a genus of mosses belonging to the family Calymperaceae.

Species:
 Calymperes acanthoneuron P. de la Varde 
 Calymperes aeruginosum Hampe ex Sande Lac. 
 Calymperes afzelii Sw.
 Calymperes schmidtii Broth.

References

Dicranales
Moss genera